Events in the year 2016 in Slovakia.

Incumbents
 President – Andrej Kiska (Independent)
 Prime Minister – Robert Fico (Smer-SD)
 Speaker of the National Council – Peter Pellegrini (Smer-SD)

Events
25-31 January (scheduled) – The 2016 European Figure Skating Championships will be hosted in Bratislava
5 March (scheduled) – The Slovak parliamentary election, 2016
30 November - Slovak parliament passed a bill that requires all religious movements and organizations to have a minimum of 50,000 verified practicing members in order to become state-recognized up from 20,000. it is wildly seen as toughens church registration rules to bar Islam.

Notable deaths

7 January – Anton Srholec, Roman Catholic priest and Salesian (born 1929)

References

 
2010s in Slovakia
Slovakia
Slovakia
Years of the 21st century in Slovakia